Andrei Codrescu (born December 20, 1946) is a Romanian-born American poet, novelist, essayist, screenwriter, and commentator for National Public Radio. He is the winner of the Peabody Award for his film Road Scholar and the Ovid Prize for poetry. He was Mac Curdy Distinguished Professor of English at Louisiana State University from 1984 until his retirement in 2009.

Biography
Codrescu’s father was an ethnic Romanian engineer; his mother was a non-practicing Jew. Their son was informed of his Jewish background at age 13. Codrescu published his first poems in Romanian under the pen name Andrei Steiu. In 1965 he and his mother, a photographer and printer, were able to leave Romania after Israel paid US$2,000 (or US$10,000, according to other sources) to the Romanian communist regime for each of them. After some time in Italy, they moved to the United States in 1966, and settled in Detroit, where he became a regular at John Sinclair's Artists and Writers' Workshop. A year later, he moved to New York, where he became part of the literary scene on the Lower East Side. There he met Allen Ginsberg, Ted Berrigan, and Anne Waldman, and published his first poems in English.

In 1970, his poetry book, License to Carry a Gun, won the "Big Table Poetry Award". He moved to San Francisco in 1970, and lived on the West Coast for seven years, four of those in Monte Rio, a Sonoma County town on the Russian River. He also lived in Baltimore (where he taught at Johns Hopkins University), New Orleans and Baton Rouge, publishing a book every year. During this time he wrote poetry, stories, essays and reviews for many publications, including The New York Times, the Chicago Tribune, the Los Angeles Times, Harper's, and the Paris Review. He had regular columns in The Baltimore Sun, the City Paper, Architecture, Funny Times, Gambit Weekly, and Neon.
 
Codrescu was a regular commentator on National Public Radio's news program, All Things Considered, from 1983 until 2016. He won the 1995 Peabody Award for the film Road Scholar, an American road movie that he wrote and starred in, and is a two-time winner of the Pushcart Prize.<ref>{{Cite news |last=Allene |first=Bruce |date=1983-08-12 |title=Pushcart Anthology review |work=The Christian Science Monitor |url=https://www.csmonitor.com/1983/0812/081273.html |access-date=2018-01-22}}</ref> His book So Recently a World: Selected Poems, 1968-2016 was a National Book Award nominee.

In 1989, Codrescu covered the Romanian Revolution of 1989 for National Public Radio and ABC News's Nightline. His renewed interest in the Romanian language and literature led to new work written in Romanian, including Miracle and Catastrophe, a book-length interview conducted by the theologian Robert Lazu, and The Forgiven Submarine, an epic poem written in collaboration with poet Ruxandra Cesereanu, which won the 2008 Radio România Cultural award. His books have been translated into Romanian by Ioana Avadani, Ioana Ieronim, Carmen Firan, Rodica Grigore, and Lacrimioara Stoie. In 2002 Codrescu returned to Romania with a PBS Frontline World video crew to "take the temperature" of his homeland and produced the story, "My Old Haunts". In 2005 he was awarded the prestigious international Ovidius Prize (also known as the Ovid Prize), previous winners of which include Mario Vargas Llosa, Amos Oz, and Orhan Pamuk.

In 1981, Codrescu became a naturalized citizen of the United States. He is the editor and founder of the online journal Exquisite Corpse, a  journal of "books and ideas". He reigned as King of the Krewe du Vieux for the 2002 New Orleans Mardi Gras season. He has two children, Lucian and Tristan, from his marriage to Alice Henderson. He is currently married to Laura Cole Rosenthal.

Codrescu's archives and much of his personal library are now part of the Louisiana State University Libraries Special Collections, University of Iowa Libraries, New Orleans Historical Society, and the University of Illinois at Urbana–Champaign.

Family
His first wife was Aurelia Munteanu. His second wife was Alice Henderson, the mother of his two sons, Lucian Codrescu and Tristan Codrescu. His third wife, Laura Rosenthal (née Cole), was an editor at Exquisite Corpse: a Journal of Books & Ideas and coeditor of three poetry anthologies.

Awards and honors
MacCurdy Distinguished Professor of English, Louisiana State University 
 Peabody Award for Road Scholar
 Ovid Prize
 National Endowment for the Arts Fellowships for poetry; editing; radio
 Big Table Poetry Award
 Lowell Thomas Gold Award for Excellence in Travel Journalism
 Towson State University Literature Prize
 General Electric Foundation Poetry Prize
 ACLU Freedom of Speech Award; Mayor's Arts Award, New Orleans
 Literature Prize of the Romanian Cultural Foundation, Bucharest

Works

Books
  
  
  
  
 2013: So Recently Rent a World: New and Selected Poems, translated into Swedish by Dan Shafran (Coffee House Press)
2011: Whatever Gets You through the Night: A Story of Sheherezade and the Arabian Entertainments (Princeton University Press)
2010: The Poetry Lesson (Princeton University Press)
2009: The Posthuman Dada Guide: Tzara and Lenin Play Chess (Princeton University Press)
2008: Jealous Witness: New Poems (with a CD by the New Orleans Klezmer All-Stars) (Coffee House Press)
2007: Submarinul iertat, with Ruxandra Cesereanu, Timişoara, Romania: Editura Brumar; translated by Andrei Codrescu, as The Forgiven Submarine, Black Widow Press, 2009.
2007: Femeia neagră a unui culcuş de hoţi, Bucharest: Editura Vinea.
2006: New Orleans, Mon Amour: Twenty Years of Writing from the City, New York and Chapel Hill: Algonquin Books.
2006: Miracol şi catastrofă: Dialogues in Cyberspace with Robert Lazu, Timişoara, Romania: Editura Hartman.
2005: Instrumentul negru. Poezii, 1965-1968, (Editura Scrisul Romanesc)
2004: Scandal of Genius: How Salvador Dali Smuggled Baudelaire into the Science Fair (Dali Museum)
2004: Wakefield: a novel, New York and Chapel Hill: Algonquin Books.
2003: It Was Today: New Poems Minneapolis: Coffee House Press
2002: Casanova in Bohemia, a novel New York: The Free Press
2001: An Involuntary Genius in America’s Shoes (and What Happened Afterwards), Santa Rosa: Black Sparrow Press, Re-issue of The Life & Times of an Involuntary Genius, 1976, and In America's Shoes, 1983, with new forward and coda-essay.
2000: The Devil Never Sleeps & Other Essays. New York: St. Martin's Press. Essays.
2000: Poezii alese/Selected Poetry, bi-lingual edition, English and Romanian Bucharest: Editura Paralela 45.
1999: A Bar in Brooklyn: Novellas & Stories, 1970-1978 Santa Rosa: Black Sparrow Press.
1999: Messiah, a novel. New York: Simon & Schuster.
1999: Hail Babylon! Looking for the American City at the End of the Millennium. New York: St. Martin's Press 1999, New York and London: Picador, 1999. Essays.
1999: Ay, Cuba! A Socio-Erotic Journey. With photographs by David Graham. New York: St. Martin's Press, New York and London: Picador. Travel/Essay.
1997: The Dog With the Chip in His Neck: Essays from NPR & Elsewhere. New York: St. Martin's Press, New York and London: Picador.
1996: Alien Candor: Selected Poems, 1970-1995, Santa Rosa: Black Sparrow Press.
1995: The Muse Is Always Half-Dressed in New Orleans. New York: St. Martin's Press. New York and London: Picador, 1996. Essays.
1995: The Blood Countess. New York: Simon & Schuster. New York: Dell.
1995: Zombification: Essays from NPR. New York: St. Martin's Press. New York and London: Picador.
1994: The Repentance of Lorraine, New York: Rhinoceros Books. Reprint with new introduction of 1976 Pocketbooks edition by Ames Claire)
1993: Belligerence, Minneapolis: Coffee House Press.
1993: Road Scholar: Coast to Coast Late in the Century, with photographs by David Graham. A journal of the making of the movie Road Scholar. New York: Hyperion.
1991: The Hole in the Flag: a Romanian Exile's Story of Return and Revolution (New York: Morrow. New York: Avon.
1991: Comrade Past and Mister Present, Minneapolis: Coffee House Press.
1990: The Disappearance of the Outside: a Manifesto for Escape. Boston: Addison-Wesley Co.1990; reissued by Ruminator Press, 2001
1988: A Craving for Swan, Columbus: Ohio State University Press.
1987: Monsieur Teste in America & Other Instances of Realism, Minneapolis: Coffee House Press.
1987: Raised by Puppets Only to Be Killed by Research, Boston: Addison-Wesley.
1983: In America’s Shoes, San Francisco: City Lights.
1983: Selected Poems 1970-1980, New York: Sun Books.
1982: Necrocorrida. San Francisco: Panjandrum Books.
1979: The Lady Painter, Boston: Four Zoas Press.
1978: For the Love of a Coat, Boston: Four Zoas Press.
1975: The Life & Times of an Involuntary Genius. New York: George Braziller.
1974: The Marriage of Insult & Injury. Woodstock: Cymric Press.
1973: The History of the Growth of Heaven. New York: George Braziller.
1973: A Serious Morning. Santa Barbara: Capra Press.
1971: Why I Can’t Talk on the Telephone, San Francisco: kingdom kum press.
 

Editor/founder
1983-1997 
1997-2011 , the online version

Anthologies edited
  
 
 
 
  
  

As translator
  
 

 Presence in English Language Anthologies 
 
 
 
 

Controversial comments
Codrescu was a commentator for NPR, and on the December 19, 1995, broadcast of All Things Considered'', Codrescu reported that some Christians believe in a "rapture" and four million believers will ascend to Heaven immediately. He continued, "The evaporation of 4 million who believe this crap would leave the world an instantly better place."

NPR subsequently apologized for Codrescu's comments, saying, "Those remarks offended listeners and crossed a line of taste and tolerance that we should have defended with greater vigilance."

Further reading

References

External links

 Andrei Codrescu's webpage
 Exquisite Corpse, Codrescu's online literary magazine
 "Andrei Codrescu", NPR Biography
 Video: Andrei Codrescu - "The Posthuman DADA Guide: Tzara and Lenin Play Chess", presentation in Portland, Oregon, on April 30, 2009, from the recent book tour
 Voices on Antisemitism - Interview with Andrei Codrescu from the U.S. Holocaust Memorial Museum
 Andrei Codrescu is a regular contributor to Mineshaft magazine.

1946 births
Living people
20th-century American novelists
American radio journalists
American male screenwriters
Jewish American poets
Louisiana State University faculty
NPR personalities
People from Sibiu
Romanian essayists
Jewish Romanian writers
Romanian emigrants to the United States
Romanian journalists
Romanian novelists
Romanian poets
American male poets
Romanian male writers
Jewish American novelists
21st-century American novelists
20th-century American poets
21st-century American poets
Surrealist poets
American male novelists
American male essayists
21st-century American essayists
20th-century American male writers
21st-century American male writers
Novelists from Louisiana
20th-century American essayists
Screenwriters from Louisiana
21st-century American Jews